Apalachee Province was the area in the Panhandle of the present-day U.S. state of Florida inhabited by the Native American peoples known as the Apalachee at the time of European contact. The southernmost extent of the Mississippian culture, the Apalachee lived in what is now Leon County, Wakulla County and Jefferson County. The name was in use during the early period of European exploration. During Spanish colonization, the Apalachee Province became one of the four major provinces in the Spanish mission system, the others being the Timucua Province, (between the St. Johns and Suwanee Rivers), the Mocama Province (along the Atlantic coast of what is now northern Florida and southern Georgia) and the Guale Province (along the Georgia coast north of the Altamaha River).

History
Around 12,000 years ago, bands of indigenous peoples roamed the hilltops and lake shores of what are now Leon County and Jefferson County.  They lived by hunting, fishing and gathering.  Eventually they became more settled, making stone tools, pottery, and then domesticating plants. By 1000 A.D., the indigenous people developed agriculture and cultivated numerous plants, particularly varieties of maize, as the main staple food.  Native Americans lived in scattered villages made up of farmsteads but gradually developed agricultural surpluses that allowed more population density.

Apalachee Province was closely linked by trading and cultural exchange to other Native American cultures throughout the interior Southeast, including the later Southeastern Ceremonial Complex (SECC).  As many as 60,000 people lived in 40 towns scattered through the area. Production of surpluses of maize aided in the growth of towns and more complex cultures.  The elite organized workers to construct complex earthwork mounds for religious, political and ceremonial purposes.

The historical Apalachee occupied the Velda Mound site from about 1450 CE-1625 CE, although they mostly abandoned the site soon after the beginning of the Spanish Mission Period, c. 1565. After the Spanish began colonization and brought in missions, they called this cultural area the Apalachee Province.

The Apalachee Province was heavily depopulated with Carolina governor James Moore's raids into the area during Queen Anne's War. Most of the Spanish missions in the province were destroyed during the Apalachee massacre.

Towns
Anhaica was the capital of Apalachee Province, located near Myers Park in Tallahassee.
Lake Jackson Mound site is located on the southern shore of Lake Jackson.
Velda Mound was the center of an older town located north of Tallahassee.  It is now within the Killearn Estates neighborhood.

See also
 Mission San Luis de Apalachee

Notes

References
The Apalachee and Mission San Luis

External links
Woodville Karst Plain Project
Leon County Public Works
Mission San Luis

Apalachee
Fort Walton culture
Archaeological sites in Florida
Regions of Florida
History of Leon County, Florida
Native American tribes in Florida
Spanish missions in Florida
Colonial United States (Spanish)
Spanish colonization of the Americas